Kilkenny RFC is an Irish rugby team based in Kilkenny, County Kilkenny, playing in Division 1A of the Leinster League. The club colours are black and white.

Honours
 Leinster Junior Challenge Cup: 1920
 Leinster Towns Cup: 1955, 1959, 1986, 2001, 2002, 2022
 Leinster League Division One: 2001/2002, 2002/2003
 South East League: 2002, 2005

References
 Kilkenny RFC

Irish rugby union teams
Rugby clubs established in 1886
Rugby union clubs in County Kilkenny